In mathematics, the  Jucys–Murphy elements in the group algebra  of the symmetric group, named after Algimantas Adolfas Jucys and G. E. Murphy, are defined as a sum of transpositions by the formula:

They play an important role in the representation theory of the symmetric group.

Properties

The vectors constituting   the basis of Young's "seminormal representation"   are eigenvectors for the action of Xn.  For any standard Young tableau U we have:

where ck(U) is the content b − a of the cell (a, b) occupied by  k in the standard Young tableau U.

Theorem (Jucys): The center  of the group algebra   of the symmetric group is generated by the symmetric polynomials in the elements Xk.

Theorem (Jucys): Let t be a formal variable commuting with everything, then the following identity for polynomials in variable t with values in the group algebra   holds true:

Theorem (Okounkov–Vershik): The subalgebra of   generated by the centers

 

is exactly the subalgebra generated by the Jucys–Murphy elements Xk.

See also
 Representation theory of the symmetric group
 Young symmetrizer

References

Permutation groups
Representation theory
Symmetry
Representation theory of finite groups
Symmetric functions